Dexippus taiwanensis is a jumping spider, similar in appearance to D. kleini. It is endemic to Taiwan, which provides its specific epithet "taiwanensis".

References

  (2002): Four new and two newly recorded species of Taiwanese jumping spiders (Araneae: Salticidae) deposited in the United States. Zoological Studies 41(3): 337-345. PDF

Salticidae
Endemic fauna of Taiwan
Spiders of Taiwan
Spiders described in 2002